Deir al-Bukht (also spelled Deir al-Bukhit or Dayr al-Bakht) is a town in southern Syria, administratively part of the al-Sanamayn District of the Daraa Governorate located north of Daraa. It is situated about 63 kilometers south of the capital Damascus. Nearby localities include al-Sanamayn to the south, Kafr Shams to the southwest, Deir al-Adas to the west, Ghabaghib to the northeast, Muthabin to the east and Jabab to the southeast. In the 2004 census by the Syria Central Bureau of Statistics (CBS), Deir al-Bukht had a population of 5,381.

History 
The name "Deir al-Bukht" is Arabic for "Convent of the Bactrian Camel." According to early 13th-century Syrian geographer Yaqut al-Hamawi, Deir al-Bukht had previously been known as "Deir Mikhail", a monastery dedicated to Saint Michael. It received its current name as a result of early 8th-century Umayyad caliph Abd al-Malik's habit of having a Bactrian camel saddled at the monastery.

A member of the Abbasid family, Ali ibn Abdullah ibn Abbas, maintained a garden at Deir al-Bukht for recreation during the reign of Abd al-Malik's successor, al-Walid. Ali was accused of killing his adopted brother Salit in Deir al-Bukht, but Sulayman ibn Abd al-Malik and Ubaydallah ibn Ziyad interjected on Ali's behalf, persuading al-Walid to spare his life. Ali was imprisoned instead.

In 1596 Dayr al-Buht  appeared in the Ottoman  tax registers as part of the nahiya of Bani Kilab in  Hauran Sanjak. It had an entirely Muslim population consisting of 15 households and 6 bachelors. The villagers paid a fixed tax-rate of 20% on  wheat, barley, summer crops, goats and/or beehives; a total of 5,770 akçe. Half of the revenue went to  a waqf.

In the 19th-century Biblical scholar Eli Smith noted that Deir al-Bukht was a Muslim village.

During the French Mandate period, Deir al-Bukht was the center of the 'Al al-Zubi clan which controlled a total of 16 villages in the Hauran, including Khirbet Ghazaleh and al-Musayfirah, and provided the local religious leadership of the Qadiriyya,  Sufi Muslim order dating back to the 12th century. The head of the clan was Muflih al-Zubi who served as a deputy of the French Mandate authorities.

References

Bibliography

External links
 Map of town, Google Maps
 Sanameine-map; 19L

Populated places in Al-Sanamayn District